Ivan Katchanovski,  (born 1967) is a Ukrainian Canadian political scientist. He teaches at the School of Political Studies at the University of Ottawa. Katchanovski specializes in research in democratization, comparative politics, political communication, and conflicts, in particular, in Ukraine, and especially the origins of Russo-Ukrainian War.

False flag theory of Euromaidan
In October 2014, in a seminar at his own university and again, in a revised version, at the Annual Meeting of the American Political Science Association in San Francisco in September 2015, Katchanovski presented his research arguing that leaders of the anti-government Euromaidan gained power as a result of a massacre organised by their own supporters, based on video footage, TV and Internet broadcasting, radio intercepts, witness testimonies, and bullet hole locations. The paper argued that "armed groups and the leadership of the far right organizations, such as the Right Sector, Svoboda and oligarchic parties, such as Fatherland, were directly or indirectly involved in various capacities in this massacre of the protesters and the police." 

Katchanovski's original paper was criticised by David R. Marples. Marples called it "not academic", "chaotic" and "politically driven", but also acknowledged that Katchanovski "has raised some new evidence that suggests new investigations into the sniper massacres are much needed," that "the official version of events is indeed deeply troublesome and his gathering of new material is commendable," and that "his paper does provide evidence that there were several separate groups of snipers, including anti-government ones."

Subsequently, in 2016 Katchanovski published a book chapter, which summarized findings presented in his paper, and in 2020 a peer-reviewed article in the Journal of Labor and Society, which concluded that "the Right Sector and Svoboda had crucial roles in the violent overthrow of the Viktor Yanukovych government, in particular, in the Maidan massacre of the protesters and the police on February 18–20, 2014." His paper, which he presented at the 10th World Congress of the International Council for Central and East European Studies in Montreal in 2021, stated that "the Maidan massacre trials and investigations have revealed various evidence that four killed and several dozen wounded policemen and at least the absolute majority of 49 killed and 157 wounded Maidan protesters were massacred on February 20, 2014 by snipers in Maidan-controlled buildings and areas."

According to fact-checking news website Polygraph.info, Katchanovski proposed a false flag theory that Georgian snipers were hired by Maidan leaders to shoot Maidan protestors and this theory was cited by Oliver Stone and supported by Vladimir Putin in his interview to Stone.

2022 Russian invasion of Ukraine
In 2022, the Russian Federation invaded Ukraine. One of the reasons used by the Russian government to attack Ukraine was 'denazification'. According to Katchanovski "Neo-Nazis are a relatively small segment of Ukraine" but the fact that "they are integrated in the Ukrainian armed forces and tolerated by Zelenskyy" has been exploited by Russian propaganda to justify the invasion. He also stated that the war could have been avoided with the implementation of the Minsk agreements and Ukraine's promise to remain a neutral country.

Before the Russian invasion, Katchanovski had stated that there was a real possibility of war between Russia and Ukraine. Prior to the war and one month into the fightings, Katchanovski stated that Ukraine could be offered EU membership as part of a peace deal in which Ukraine agreed to renounce NATO membership and declare itself neutral. Katchanovski claimed that there would be negative consequences for EU countries if Russia decided to stop selling natural gas as a blackmail weapon. On 10 June 2022, he suggested that the Russian government intended to annex all areas occupied by the army in eastern and southern Ukraine.

Books
 Cleft Countries: Regional Political Divisions and Cultures in Post-Soviet Ukraine and Moldova, ibidem-Verlag, 2006 
 Nina Virchenko, Ivan Katchanovski, Viktor Haidey, Roman Andrushkiw and Roman Voronka (editors), Development of the Mathematical Ideas of Mykhailo Kravchuk (Krawtchouk), National Technical University of Ukraine, Kyiv and Shevchenko Scientific Society (USA), New York, 2004.
 Seymour Martin Lipset and Noah M. Meltz with Rafael Gomez and Ivan Katchanovski  The Paradox of American Unionism: Why Americans Like Unions More Than Canadians Do, But Join Much Less, Cornell University Press, 2012 
 Ivan Katchanovski, Zenon E. Kohut, Bohdan Y. Nebesio, Myroslav Yurkevich, Historical Dictionary of Ukraine Scarecrow Press, 11 Jul 2013.

References

External links
 

Ukrainian political scientists
Academic staff of the University of Ottawa
1967 births
Living people